Pseudolaguvia nepalensis is a species of catfish  from Nepal.

References

Catfish of Asia
Fish of India
Taxa named by Asha Rayamajhi
Taxa named by Muthukumarasamy Arunachalam
Fish described in 2016
Erethistidae